Goethe usually refers to the German writer Johann Wolfgang von Goethe (1749–1832).

Goethe may also refer to:
 Goethe (surname)
 Goethe (grape),  grape variety
 Goethe (train), an express train formerly operated in France and Germany
 3047 Goethe, asteroid
 Goethe!, a 2010 film by Philipp Stölzl
 Mount Goethe, a mountain in California

See also 
 Goethe University Frankfurt
 Goethe-Institut, non-profit organisation
 Goethe Awards
 Goethe Prize
 Goethe Medal
 Goethe Basin
 Gote (disambiguation)